was a Japanese composer and one of the first Japanese women to compose classical music in the Western  tradition.

Biography
Kikuko Kawahira was born on the Ryukyu island of Miyako-jima, Okinawa, and studied voice at the Nihon Music School and composition at Tokyo Music School. She studied with teachers including with Taijiro Goh, Kanichi Shimofusa, Hisatada Otaka and Kishio Hirao. Working as a composer, she produced songs and orchestral music using the Ryukyuan pentatonic scale.

In 1954 she studied the dodecaphonic method in Brazil with Hans-Joachim Koellreutter, and incorporated atonal composition into her work. She was awarded the Mainichi Prize for Cultural Publication in 1955, and a prize by the Okinawan government for her opera Okinawa monogatari in 1968. She died in Tokyo.

The BBC describe her as "one of the first Japanese women to compose Western classical music".

Works
Selected works include:
Ryūkyū no min’yō ('Folksongs of Ryūkyū') 1954
Okinawa monogatari opera
Miyako-jima engi (Legend of Miyako Island) (ballet), 1949
Ryūkyū hiwa (A Hidden Story of Ryūkyū) (jazz ballet), 1951
Hiren Karafune (Love Tragedy on Tang Boat) (op, 4, Kanai and K. Yano), 1960
Okinawa monogatari (Tale of Okinawa), 1997
Symphony, no.1, 1938
Okinawa buyō kumikyoku (Okinawan Dance Suite): no.1, 1940, no.2, 1946
Ryūkyū kyōsōkyoku (Ryūkyū Rhapsody) no.1, 1946
Symphony, no.2, 1946
Uruma no shi (Poem on Uruma), 1952
Festival Overture 'Hishō''', 1972Ryūkyū kyōsōkyoku no.2, pianoforte octet, 1950Ryūkyū Ballade, pianoforte, 1951Sonata, violin, pianoforte, 1952Brazil Rhapsody, pianoforte, 1955Hamachidori hensōkyoku (Variations on Hamachidori), koto, Electone, percussion, 1970Okinawa min'yō niyoru gasshōkyoku-shū (Choral Pieces on Okinawan Folksongs), 1953–60Haha to ko no Okinawa no uta (Okinawan Songs for a Mother and Children), 1965

Her work has been recorded and issued on CD, including:Just For Me - Noriko Ogawa plays Japanese piano music (1997) BISBridges to Japan'' Audio CD (17 October 2000) Bis, ASIN: B0000508RU

References

1911 births
1986 deaths
20th-century classical composers
20th-century Japanese composers
20th-century women composers
Japanese classical composers
Japanese women classical composers
Japanese opera composers
Musicians from Okinawa Prefecture
People from Okinawa Prefecture
Women opera composers